Grayson O'Neil Garvin (born October 27, 1989) is an American professional baseball pitcher who is currently a free agent.

Career
Garvin attended Wesleyan School in Norcross, Georgia. He was drafted by the Houston Astros in the 45th round of the 2008 Major League Baseball draft, but did not sign and played college baseball at Vanderbilt University. Garvin was mostly a relief pitcher in his first two seasons at Vanderbilt. In 2009, he played collegiate summer baseball for the Falmouth Commodores of the Cape Cod Baseball League, and returned to the league in 2010 with the Bourne Braves, where he won the league's Outstanding Pitcher award. As a junior in 2011, he became a full-time starter, going 13–2 with a 2.48 earned run average (ERA) and 101 strikeouts in 18 starts. For his play he was named the SEC Pitcher of the Year.

Garvin was drafted by the Tampa Bay Rays in the first round of the 2011 Major League Baseball draft. He signed with the Rays and made his professional debut in 2012 with the Charlotte Stone Crabs. He pitched in 11 games (ten starts) in which he compiled a 2-4 record and a 5.05 ERA before suffering an injury that required Tommy John surgery, thus ending his season.

Garvin returned in 2013 to start 11 games for the Gulf Coast Rays and Charlotte. In those 11 starts, he was 0-2 with a 1.59 ERA. He played 2014 with the Montgomery Biscuits, going 1-8 with a 3.77 ERA in 20 starts. He pitched only 74 innings due to injuries. He missed all of the 2015 season due to injury. In 2016, he pitched for the GCL Rays and Charlotte, pitching to a 0-1 record and a 3.48 ERA in 33.2 innings pitched. He did not pitch in 2017.

Garvin elected free agency on November 6, 2017.

References

External links

Vanderbilt Commodores bio

1989 births
Living people
People from Suwanee, Georgia
Sportspeople from the Atlanta metropolitan area
Baseball players from Georgia (U.S. state)
Vanderbilt Commodores baseball players
Falmouth Commodores players
Bourne Braves players
Charlotte Stone Crabs players
Gulf Coast Rays players
Montgomery Biscuits players
Salt River Rafters players